Chharka Tangsong is a rural municipality located in Dolpa District of Karnali Province of Nepal.

The rural municipality is divided into total 6 wards and the headquarters of the rural municipality is situated at Chharka.

Demographics
At the time of the 2011 Nepal census, 49.8% of the population in Chharka Tangsong Rural Municipality spoke Dolpali, 34.3% Gurung, 9.7% Magar and 5.7% Sherpa as their first language; 0.5% spoke other languages.

In terms of ethnicity/caste, 55.5% were Dolpo, 34.3% Gurung, 9.9% Magar and 0.3% others.

In terms of religion, 99.5% were Buddhist, 0.5% Hindu and 0.1% Christian.

References

External links
 Official website

Populated places in Dolpa District
Rural municipalities in Karnali Province
Rural municipalities of Nepal established in 2017